Samuel Scott Fletcher (born February 21, 1881 in Bedford, Pennsylvania) was a pitcher in Major League Baseball. He played for the Brooklyn Superbas in 1909 and the Cincinnati Reds in 1912.

External links

1881 births
Year of death unknown
People from Bedford, Pennsylvania
Baseball players from Pennsylvania
Major League Baseball pitchers
Cincinnati Reds players
Brooklyn Superbas players
Reading (baseball) players
Cincinnati Cams players